Saxum Nunatak is an isolated nunatak, standing 6 nautical miles (11 km) north of Mount Tholus on the north side of Joinville Island. It is dome-shaped when seen from the south, but has a conspicuous rock wall on its northern side. Surveyed by the Falkland Islands Dependencies Survey (FIDS) in 1954. The name is descriptive of the feature as seen from the north, "saxum" being Latin for wall.

Nunataks of Graham Land
Landforms of the Joinville Island group